Annexin A1, also known as  lipocortin I, is a protein that is encoded by the ANXA1 gene in humans.

Function 

Annexin A1 belongs to the annexin family of Ca2+-dependent phospholipid-binding proteins that have a molecular weight of approximately 35,000 to 40,000 Dalton and are preferentially located on the cytosolic face of the plasma membrane. Annexin A1 protein has an apparent relative molecular mass of 40 kDa with phospholipase A2 inhibitory activity.

Clinical significance

Effect on innate and adaptive immunity
Glucocorticoids (such as budesonide, cortisol, and beclomethasone) are a class of endogenous or synthetic anti-inflammatory steroid hormones that bind to the glucocorticoid receptor (GR), which is present in almost every vertebrate animal cell. They are used in medicine to treat diseases caused by an overactive immune system, including allergies, asthma, autoimmune diseases, and sepsis. Because they suppress inflammatory pathways, long-term use of glucocorticoid drugs can lead to side-effects such as immunodeficiency and adrenal insufficiency. 

The main mechanism of glucocorticoids' anti-inflammatory effects is to increase the synthesis and function of annexin A1. Annexin A1 both suppresses phospholipase A2, thereby blocking eicosanoid production, and inhibits various leukocyte inflammatory events (epithelial adhesion, emigration, chemotaxis, phagocytosis, respiratory burst, etc.). In other words, glucocorticoids not only suppress immune response, but also inhibit the two main products of inflammation, prostaglandins and leukotrienes. They inhibit prostaglandin synthesis at the level of phospholipase A2 as well as at the level of cyclooxygenase/PGE isomerase (COX-1 and COX-2), the latter effect being much like that of NSAIDs, potentiating the anti-inflammatory effect.

In resting conditions, human and mouse immune cells such as neutrophils, monocytes, and macrophages contain high levels of annexin A1 in their cytoplasm. Following cell activation (for example, by neutrophil adhesion to endothelial-cell monolayers), annexin A1 is promptly mobilized to the cell surface and secreted. Annexin A1 promotes neutrophil detachment and apoptosis, and phagocytosis of apoptotic neutrophils by macrophages. On the other hand, it reduces the tendency of neutrophils to penetrate the endothelium of blood vessels. In vitro and in vivo analyses show that exogenous and endogenous annexin A1 counter-regulate the activities of innate immune cells, particularly extravasation and the generation of proinflammatory mediators, which ensures that a sufficient level of activation is reached but not exceeded.

Annexin A1 has important opposing properties during innate and adaptive immune responses: it inhibits innate immune cells and promotes T-cell activation. The activation of T cells results in the release of annexin A1 and the expression of its receptor. This pathway seems to fine-tune the strength of TCR signalling. Higher expression of annexin A1 during pathological conditions could increase the strength of TCR signalling through the mitogen-activated protein kinase signalling pathway, thereby causing a state of hyperactivation of T cells.

Inflammation 

Since phospholipase A2 is required for the biosynthesis of the potent mediators of inflammation, prostaglandins, and leukotrienes, annexin A1 may have potential anti-inflammatory activity.

Glucocorticoids stimulate production of lipocortin. In this way, synthesis of eicosanoids are inhibited.

Cancer 

Annexin A1 has been of interest for use as a potential anticancer drug. Upon induction by modified NSAIDS and other potent anti-inflammatory drugs, annexin A1 inhibits the NF-κB signal transduction pathway, which is exploited by cancerous cells to proliferate and avoid apoptosis. ANXA1 inhibits the activation of NF-κB by binding to the p65 subunit.

Leukemia 

The gene for annexin A1 (ANXA1) is upregulated in hairy cell leukemia. ANXA1 protein expression is specific to hairy cell leukemia. Detection of ANXA1 (by immunocytochemical means) reportedly provides a simple, highly sensitive, and specific assay for the diagnosis of hairy cell leukemia.

Breast cancer 

Altered annexin A1 expression levels through modulation of the immune system effects the initiation and spread of breast cancer, but the association is complex and conclusions of published studies often conflict.

Exposure of MCF-7 breast cancer cells to high physiological levels (up to 100 nM) of estrogen lead to an up-regulation of annexin A1 expression partially through the activation of CREB, and dependent on activation of the estrogen receptor alpha.  Treatment of MCF-7 cells with physiological levels of estrogen (1 nM) induced proliferation while high pregnancy levels of estrogen (100 nM) induced a growth arrest of MCF-7 cells.  Silencing of ANXA1 with specific siRNA reverses the estrogen-dependent proliferation as well as growth arrest.  ANXA1 is lost in clinical breast cancer, indicating that the anti-proliferative protective function of ANXA1 against high levels of estrogen may be lost in breast cancer. This data suggests that ANXA1 may act as a tumor suppressor gene and modulate the proliferative functions of estrogens.

Annexin A1  protects against DNA damage induced by heat in breast cancer cells, adding to the evidence that it has tumor suppressive and protective activities.  When ANXA1 is silenced or lost in cancer, cells are more prone to DNA damage, indicating its unidentified diverse role in genome maintenance or integrity.
Annexin A1 has also been shown to be associated with treatment resistance. ARID1A loss activates annexin A1 expression, which is required for drug resistance (mTOR inhibitor or trastuzumab) through its activation of AKT.

References

Further reading

External links 

 
 

Peripheral membrane proteins